Bashall Eaves is a civil parish in Ribble Valley, Lancashire, England.  It contains 22 listed buildings that are recorded in the National Heritage List for England.  Of these, three are at Grade II*, the middle grade, and the others are at Grade II, the lowest grade.   The parish contains the village of Bashall Eaves, and is otherwise rural.  The most important building in the parish is Bashall Hall; this and structures are associated with it are listed.  Most of the other listed buildings are houses and associated structures, farmhouses and farm buildings.  In addition, three bridges and a public house are listed.

Key

Buildings

Notes and references

Notes

Citations

Sources

Lists of listed buildings in Lancashire
Buildings and structures in Ribble Valley